Mitromorpha saotomensis is a species of sea snail, a marine gastropod mollusk in the family Mitromorphidae.

Description

Distribution
This species occurs in the Atlantic Ocean off São Tomé and Príncipe.

References

saotomensis
Gastropods described in 2001
Fauna of São Tomé Island